Elizabeth Davey Lochrie (July 1, 1890 – May 17, 1981) was an American painter, sculptor, and muralist born in Deer Lodge, Montana. She is best remembered for her portraits and portrayal of Native Americans and their lifestyle in the Montana and Idaho area.

Personal life
Lochrie studied at the Pratt Institute in New York City  with Winold Reiss and Victor Arnautoff and at Stanford University in California.

Lochrie was an artist with the Federal Art Project and painted post office murals for the Treasury Section of Fine Arts in Burley and St. Anthony in Idaho. For the post office at Dillon in Montana she painted a mural News from the States.

In 1932, the Blackfeet Nation adopted her, giving her the name, "Netchitaki" which means "Woman Alone in Her Way."

References

Further reading
Elizabeth Lochrie
Elizabeth Lochrie: Woman Alone in her Way Biography Exhibit Hockaday Museum of Art

1890 births
1981 deaths
American women painters
Modern painters
American muralists
20th-century American painters
American women sculptors
Artists from Montana
People from Deer Lodge, Montana
Pratt Institute alumni
Stanford University alumni
20th-century American sculptors
People of the New Deal arts projects
20th-century American women artists
Women muralists